The 2005 China Baseball League season saw the Beijing Tigers defeat the Tianjin Lions in 2 games to win the Championship Series.

Standings

Awards

References

China Baseball League